James M. Smith  (December 31, 1919 – April 14, 2017) was the longest serving commissioner of Yukon from November 7, 1966 to June 30, 1976. During his tenure, he was instrumental in the creation of Kluane National Park and Reserve and the designation of the Chilkoot Trail as a National Historic Site of Canada. He was also responsible for creating the Arctic Winter Games along with Northwest Territories commissioner Stuart Hodgson and Alaska governor Walter Joseph Hickel. He was made an Officer of the Order of Canada in 1976.

References

External links
Commissioners of the Yukon Territory

1919 births
2017 deaths
Members of the Yukon Territorial Council
Commissioners of Yukon